Idle railway station was a short-lived station serving Idle, near Bradford, West Yorkshire, England.

It was built by the Leeds and Bradford Railway in 1847, but it was closed the next year. It was located near the west entrance of the Thackley Tunnel.
This station was very much closer to Thackley than to Idle.

Later, in 1875 another Idle station was built, on the Great Northern Railway's Shipley Windhill Line.

References

 Whitaker, Alan & Myland, Brian, 1993 Railway Memories No. 4: Bradford. Bellcode Books, 
 Bairstow, Martin 2004 Railways Through Airedale & Wharfedale. 

Disused railway stations in Bradford
Former Midland Railway stations 
Railway stations in Great Britain opened in 1847
Railway stations in Great Britain closed in 1848
1847 establishments in England